In fluid dynamics, a stagnation point is a point in a flow field where the local velocity of the fluid is zero. A plentiful, albeit surprising, example of such points seem to appear in all but the most extreme cases of fluid dynamics in the form of the "No-slip condition"; the assumption that any portion of a flow field lying along some boundary consists of nothing but stagnation points (the question as to whether this assumption reflects reality or is simply a mathematical convenience has been a continuous subject of debate since the principle was first established). The Bernoulli equation shows that the static pressure is highest when the velocity is zero and hence static pressure is at its maximum value at stagnation points: in this case static pressure equals stagnation pressure.

The Bernoulli equation applicable to incompressible flow shows that the stagnation pressure is equal to the dynamic pressure plus static pressure.  Total pressure is also equal to dynamic pressure plus static pressure so, in incompressible flows, stagnation pressure is equal to total pressure.   (In compressible flows, stagnation pressure is also equal to total pressure providing the fluid entering the stagnation point is brought to rest isentropically.)

Pressure coefficient
This information can be used to show that the pressure coefficient  at a stagnation point is unity (positive one):

where:
 is pressure coefficient
 is static pressure at the point at which pressure coefficient is being evaluated
 is static pressure at points remote from the body (freestream static pressure)
 is dynamic pressure at points remote from the body (freestream dynamic pressure)

Stagnation pressure minus freestream static pressure is equal to freestream dynamic pressure; therefore the pressure coefficient  at stagnation points is +1.

Kutta condition
On a streamlined body fully immersed in a potential flow, there are two stagnation points—one near the leading edge and one near the trailing edge. On a body with a sharp point such as the trailing edge of a wing, the Kutta condition specifies that a stagnation point is located at that point. The streamline at a stagnation point is perpendicular to the surface of the body.

See also
Stagnation point flow

Notes

Fluid dynamics